John Anton Stuper (born May 9, 1957) is a former baseball coach and former pitcher. He attended Point Park University before playing professionally from 1982–1985 for the St. Louis Cardinals and the Cincinnati Reds. He then served as the head coach of the Yale Bulldogs (1993–2022).

Playing career

Pittsburgh

Stuper was originally drafted by the Pittsburgh Pirates on June 6, 1978. He was traded on January 25, 1979 to the St. Louis Cardinals for Tommy Sandt before making it to the majors.

St. Louis Cardinals

He was 25 years old when he broke into Major League Baseball on June 1, 1982, for the St. Louis Cardinals. In his debut he pitched 8 innings against the San Francisco Giants but ended with a no-decision as Jack Clark singled in Darrell Evans in the top of the 11th and the Giants beat the Cardinals 4–3 in St. Louis.

On October 19, 1982, Stuper pitched a complete game as the Cardinals defeated the Milwaukee Brewers, 13–1, in the sixth game of the 1982 World Series to tie the series at three games each. Stuper retired thirteen batters in a row, tying a rookie record set by Dickey Kerr for the White Sox in 1919. The Cardinals won the seventh game the following day by a score of 6–3.

Cincinnati Reds

On September 9, 1984 he was traded by the St. Louis Cardinals to the Cincinnati Reds for Paul Householder.

Montreal Expos

On December 19, 1985 he was traded with Dann Bilardello, Andy McGaffigan, and Jay Tibbs to the Montreal Expos for Bill Gullickson and Sal Butera, but never played a game for the Expos.

Career statistics

Stuper was listed by Sports Illustrated as among the ten best performances by a rookie pitcher in the history of post-season play for his Game 6 complete game.

162-game averages

In 1983 Stuper finished 9th in the National League with 8 wild pitches.
His lifetime batting average was .112 (15/134).

Coaching career

Butler County Community College
A month after being released by the Expos in 1986, Stuper was hired as the head baseball coach at Butler County Community College. He said it was his intention to coach at BCCC while working on his master's degree at Slippery Rock University. Stuper implemented lessons learned from his former Cardinals manager, Whitey Herzog, and oversaw aggressive Butler teams which set school records in runs and stolen bases. He led the school to a record of 92–68.

St. Louis Cardinals
Stuper served as a pitching coach in the Cardinals farm system in 1991 and 1992. He spent the first year in the Florida State League and the second year in the South Atlantic League.

Yale
Stuper served as the 13th head coach for the Yale Bulldogs baseball team. Stuper led the Elis to three Red Rolfe Division titles and two league championships. His 1993 squad was his best, winning a school-record 33 games, earning an NCAA Regional appearance, and setting numerous school records, including 160 stolen bases in 44 games. He earned 1993 New England Division I Coach of the Year and Northeast Region Division I Coach of the Year honors. His Ivy League conference record at Yale is 237–261, and he was the winningest coach in school history with an overall record of 535–610.

Head coaching records
The following is a table of Stuper's yearly records as an NCAA Division I head baseball coach.

References

External links

1957 births
Living people
Major League Baseball pitchers
Cincinnati Reds players
Butler Grizzlies baseball players
Junior college men's basketball players in the United States
St. Louis Cardinals players
Yale Bulldogs baseball coaches
Point Park Pioneers baseball players
People from Butler, Pennsylvania
Baseball players from Pennsylvania
Arkansas Travelers players
Charleston Pirates players
Louisville Redbirds players
Springfield Redbirds players
St. Petersburg Cardinals players
Vancouver Canadians players
American expatriate baseball players in Canada
Junior college baseball coaches in the United States
Junior college baseball players in the United States
Slippery Rock University of Pennsylvania alumni
Minor league baseball coaches